Charles Adam (22 March 1919 – 30 September 1996) was a Scottish professional footballer who played for Strathclyde, Leicester City and Mansfield Town.

He scored Leicester's first post-war goal and was part of the side who finished FA Cup runners-up in 1949.

After retiring from football, he managed Leicester's youth team for 16 years between 1960–1976, winning the national FA youth trophy in 1966, with players such as David Nish and Rodney Fern.

References

1919 births
1996 deaths
Strathclyde F.C. players
Leicester City F.C. players
Mansfield Town F.C. players
Scottish footballers
Footballers from Glasgow
English Football League players
Scottish Junior Football Association players
Association football wingers
FA Cup Final players